The 2017 San Antonio FC season was the club's second season of existence. Including the San Antonio Thunder of the original NASL and the former San Antonio Scorpions of the modern NASL, this was the 8th season of professional soccer in San Antonio. The club played in the United Soccer League, a provisionally sanctioned second tier league of the United States soccer league system, and also participated in the U.S. Open Cup. San Antonio was designated as the USL affiliate of New York City FC for the 2017 season.

Club

Coaching staff
{|class="wikitable"
|-
!Position
!Staff
|-
|Head coach|| Darren Powell
|-
|Assistant coach|| Andy Thomson
|-
|Assistant coach/SAFC Pro Academy director|| Nick Evans
|-
|Goalkeeping director|| Juan Lamadrid
|-
|Head Athletic Trainer|| Yaseen Khan
|-
|Team Physician|| Eliot Young, M.D.
|-
|Equipment Manager/Team Coordinator|| Rashad Moore
|-

Other information

|-

Squad information

First-team squad

Player movement

In

Out

Loan in

Loan out

Pre-season 
The pre-season match against Minnesota United FC was announced by MNUFC on January 20, 2017. Remaining pre-season matches were announced on January 24, 2017, by SAFC.

Competitions

Overall 
Position in the Western Conference

Overview 

{| class="wikitable" style="text-align: center"
|-
!rowspan=2|Competition
!colspan=8|Record
|-
!
!
!
!
!
!
!
!
|-
| United Soccer League

|-
| USL Playoffs

|-
| U.S. Open Cup

|-
! Total

United Soccer League

League table

Results summary

Results by matchday 

Position in the Western Conference

Matches 
The first match of 2017 and the home opener were announced on January 27, 2017. The remaining schedule was released on January 31, 2017. Home team is listed first, left to right.

Kickoff times are in CDT (UTC−05) unless shown otherwise

USL Playoffs 

On September 13, 2017, San Antonio clinched a spot in the 2017 USL Playoffs.

Lamar Hunt U.S. Open Cup

Exhibition 
On May 16, 2017, it was announced that San Antonio would play an exhibition match against Santos Laguna.

Statistics

Appearances 
Discipline includes league, playoffs, and Open Cup play.

Top scorers 
The list is sorted by shirt number when total goals are equal.

Clean sheets 
The list is sorted by shirt number when total clean sheets are equal.

Summary

Awards

Player

References

San Antonio FC seasons
San Antonio
San Antonio FC
San Antonio FC